Tisangi is a village Situated in Ratnagiri district state Maharashtra country India . This village mainly consists of Bhosale dynasty. 

Villages in Ratnagiri district